A walkthrough or walk-through may refer to one of the following topics:

 Factory tour
 Rehearsal
 Software walkthrough
 Strategy guide (video games)
 Video game walkthrough
 Tutoring
 Virtual tour
 Walk-through test, a component of a financial audit

See also
 Classroom walkthrough
 Cognitive walkthrough
 List of gaming topics